Glynis or Glynnis is  a female and rarely male given name of Welsh origin. It may refer to:

Glynis Barber (born 1955), South African actress
Glynis Breakwell, (born 1952), Vice-Chancellor of the University of Bath
Glynnis Breytenbach, South African politician
Glynnis Talken Campbell (born 1957), American romance writer, composer, musician and voiceover artist
Glynis Coles (born 1954), English retired tennis player
Glynis Fester (born 1958), Miss Universe South Africa for 1977
Glynis Johns (born 1923), Welsh stage and film actress, dancer, pianist and singer
Glynis Nunn (born 1960), Australian former heptathlete, and the first Olympic champion in the event
Glynnis O'Connor (born 1955), American actress
Glynis Penny (born 1951), English former long-distance runner
Glynis Roberts (born 1961), politician from the nation of Grenada
Glynis Sweeny (born 1962), American illustrator and caricaturist

See also
Glenys

Welsh feminine given names
English feminine given names